This is a list of traditional Arabic place names.  This list includes:
 Places involved in the history of the Arab world and the Arabic names given to them.
 Places whose official names include an Arabic form.
 Places whose names originate from the Arabic language.
All names are in Standard Arabic and academically transliterated.  Most of these names are used in modern times, but many of these Arabic forms are not in active use in their namesake places—indeed, modern Arabic names for the same places have often changed to reflect and respect the place's modern non-Arabic pronunciation.

ا ʼAlif 
 أبّذة العرب Ubbaḏaḧ al-ʻArab.  Úbeda, Spain
 أبو ظبي ʼAbū Ẓaby. Abu Dhabi, United Arab Emirates
 أبو غريب ʼAbū Ġurayb.  Abu Ghraib, Iraq
 أبو قير ʼAbū Qīr. Abu Qir, Egypt
 أحساء al-ʼAḥsāʼ.  Al-Hasa, Saudi Arabia
 أحواز al-ʼahwazʼ.  Al-Ahwaz, Iran
 اَلْعَلَمَيْن al-ʼalamain. Alamein; Enham Alamein, United Kingdom (part of name)
 الاركون al-Arkun. Alarcón, Spain
 القلعة al-qalaʿâ. Alcalá de Henares, Spain
 القلعة al-qalaʿâ. Alcalà de Xivert, Spain
 المُنَكَّب al-Munakkab. Almuñécar, Spain
  al-Mudawār. Almudévar, Spain
 اخميم Aḫmīm.  Akhmim, Egypt
 إرتريّا ʼIritriyyā.  Eritrea actually derived from Greek ερυθρος, red (location next to the Red Sea).
 الأردنّ al-ʼUrdunn.  Jordan
 أركوش ʼArkūš.  Arcos, Spain
 أرنيط ʼArnīṭ.  Arnedo, Spain
 أريحا ʼArīḥā.  Jericho, West Bank (Palestine) 
 أريولة ʼUryūlaḧ.  Orihuela, Spain
 إستجّة ʼIstiǧǧaḧ.  Écija, Spain
 إسدود ʼIsdūd.  Ashdod, Israel
 إسرائيل ʼIsrāʼīl.  Israel
 الإسكندرون al-ʼIskandarūn.  İskenderun, Turkey (from Αλεξάνδρεια, Alexandria, as are all the other names derived from Alexander the Great, who founded these cities)
 إسكندريّة ʼIskandariyyaḧ.  Iskandariya, Iraq
 الإسكندريّة al-ʼIskandariyyaḧ.  Alexandria, Egypt
 اسمارا Asmārā.  Asmara, Eritrea
 أسوان ʼAswān.  Aswan, Egypt
 أشبيليّة ʼIšbīliyyaḧ.  Seville, Spain
 أطار ʼAṭār.  Atar, Mauritania
 ألش ʼAlš.  Elche, Spain.
 الإمارات العربيّة المتّحدة al-ʼImārāt al-ʼArabiyyaḧ al-Muttaḥidaḧ.  United Arab Emirates
 الأندلس al-ʼAndalus.  Al-Andalus; Andalusia, Spain
 أمّ الفحم ʼUmm al-Faḥm.  Umm al-Fahm, Israel
 أمّ قصر ʼUmm Qaṣr.  Umm Qasr, Iraq
 أمّ القيوين ʼUmm al-Qaywayn.  Umm al-Qaiwain, United Arab Emirates
 انتاكيّة Antākiyyaḧ.  Antioch, Turkey
 انواكشوط Anwākšūṭ.  Nouakchott, Mauritania
 الشرقية Aš-Šarqiyya. Axarquía, Spain
 أيلة ʼAylaḧ.  Eilat, Israel

ب Bāʼ 
 باتنة Bātnaḧ.  Batna, Algeria
 تىي لاضم     Bani Qasim. Benicasim, Spain
 باقة الغربيّة Bāqaḧ al-Ġarbiyyaḧ.  Baqa al-Gharbiyye, Israel
 البحرين al-Baḥrayn.  Bahrain
 بحرية Baḥrīyah.  Bagheria, Italy
 برغش Burġuš.  Burgos, Spain
 بريدة Burayda. Buraidah, Saudi Arabia
 البسيط al-Basīṭ.  Albacete, Spain
 البصرة al-Baṣraḧ.  Basra, Iraq
 بلنسيّة Balansiyyaḧ.  Valencia, Spain
 بَلَرْم Balarm.  Palermo, Italy
 بلد الوليد Balad al-Walid. Valladolid, Spain
 بطليوس Baṭalyaws.  Badajoz, Spain
 بعقوبه Baʻqūbaḧ.  Baquba, Iraq
 بغداد Baġdād.  Baghdad, Iraq
 بنبلونة Banbalūnaḧ.  Pamplona, Spain
 البنت al-Bunt.  Alpuente, Spain
 بنغازي Banġāzī.  Benghazi, Libya
 بوتلميت Būtilimīt.  Boutilimit, Mauritania
 بور سعيد Būr Saʻīd.  Port Said, Egypt
 بور سودان Būr Sūdān.  Port Sudan, Sudan
 بومرداس Būmardās.  Boumerdes, Algeria
 بيت جالا Bayt Ǧālā.  Beit Jala, West Bank (Palestine)
 بيت حانون Bayt Ḥānūn.  Beit Hanoun, Gaza Strip (Palestine)
 بيت لاهيّة Bayt Lāhiyyaḧ.  Beit Lahia, Gaza Strip (Palestine)
 بيت لحم Bayt Laḥm.  Bethlehem, West Bank (Palestine)
 بيروت Bayrūt.  Beirut, Lebanon
 بيسان Baysān.  Bet She'an, Israel
 بئر السّبع Biʼr as-Sabʻ.  Beersheba, Israel

ت Tāʼ 
 تهامة Tihāmah.  Tihamah, Saudi Arabia
 تبوك Tabūk.  Tabuk, Saudi Arabia
 تجكجة Tiǧikǧaḧ.  Tidjikja, Mauritania
 تدمر Tadmur.  Tadmor, Syria
 تيروال Tīrwāl. Teruel, Spain
 تشاد Tašād.  Chad
تركيا Turkiyā. Turkey
 تطيلة Tuṭīlaḧ.  Tudela, Navarre, Spain
 تكريت Tikrīt.  Tikrit, Iraq
 تلمسان Tilimsān.  Tlemcen, Algeria
 التّونس at-Tūnis.  Tunis; Tunisia
 تيبازة Tībāzaḧ.  Tipasa, Algeria
 تيشيت Tīšīt.  Tichit, Mauritania

ث Ṯhāʼ 
 ثادق thadiq. Thadig, Saudi Arabia

ج Ǧīm 
 جباليّا Ǧabāliyyā.  Jabalia, Gaza Strip
 جبل طارق Ǧabal Ṭāriq.  Gibraltar
 جبل عليّ Ǧabal ʻAliyy.  Jebel Ali, United Arab Emirates
 جبيل Ǧubayl.  Byblos, Lebanon
 الجبيل al-Ǧubayl.  Jubail, Saudi Arabia
 جدّة Ǧiddaḧ.  Jeddah, Saudi Arabia
 جرندة Ǧarundaḧ.  Girona, Spain
 الجزائر al-Ǧazāʼir.  Algiers; Algeria
 الجزيرة الخضراء al-Ǧazīraḧ al-Ḫaḍrāʼ.  Algeciras, Spain
 جزيرة شقر Ǧazīraḧ Šuqr.  Alzira, Spain
 جنين Ǧanīn.  Jenin, West Bank
 الجنينة al-Ǧunaynaḧ.  Geneina, Sudan
 جيّان Ǧayyān.  Jaén, Spain
 جيبوتي Ǧībūtī.  Djibouti.
 الجيزة al-Ǧīzaḧ.  Giza, Egypt

ح Ḥāʼ 

 الـحَـمّـة al-Hammah. Alhama de Granada, Spain 
 الحجاز al-Ḥiǧāz.  Hejaz, Saudi Arabia
 حصن المعدن Ḥiṣn al-Maʻdin.  Almada, Portugal
 حضرموت Ḥaḍramawt.  Hadhramaut, Yemen
 حرمة Ḥarmah.  Harmah, Saudi Arabia
 حلب Ḥalab.  Aleppo, Syria
 حمص Ḥimṣ.  Homs, Syria
 حولا Ḥūlā.  Hula, Lebanon
 الحيبة al-Ḥībaḧ.  Al-Hibah, Egypt
 حيفا Ḥayfā.  Haifa, Israel
Haidar

خ Khāʼ 
 الخارجة al-Ḫāriǧaḧ.  Kharga, Egypt
 خان يونس Ḫān Yūnis.  Khan Yunis, Gaza Strip (Palestine)
 الخبر al-Ḫubar.  Khobar, Saudi Arabia
 خربت بيت لاحي Ḫirbat Bayt Lāḥī.  Khirbet Beit Lei, West Bank (Palestine)
 الخرطوم al-Ḫarṭūm.  Khartoum, Sudan
 الخليل al-Ḫalīl.  Hebron, West Bank

د Dāl 
 الدّاخلة ad-Dāḫilaḧ.  Dakhla, Egypt.
 الدّار البيضاء ad-Dār al-Bayḍāʼ.  Casablanca, Morocco
 الدمام ad-Dammāmʼ. Dammam, Saudi Arabia
 دار السّلام Dār as-Salām.  Dar-es-Salaam, Tanzania
 دانيّة Dāniyyaḧ.  Dénia, Spain.
 دبيّ Dubayy.  Dubai, United Arab Emirates
 دلّس Dallas.  Dellys, Algeria
 دمشق الشّام Dimašq aš-Šām.  Damascus, Syria
 الدّوحة ad-Dawḥaḧ.  Doha, Qatar
 ديار بكر Diyar Bakr. Diyarbakır, Turkey

ذ Ḏāl 
 ذهبان Ḏahban. Zahban, Saudi Arabia

ر Rāʼ 
 رام الله Rām Aḷḷah.  Ramallah, Palestine
 رحمة الله Rahmatollah. Ramatuelle, France
 الرّباط ar-Rabāṭ.  Rabat, Morocco
 رفح Rafaḥ.  Rafah, Gaza Strip (Palestine)
 الرّقّة ar-Raqqaḧ.  Raqqa, Syria
 الرّمادي ar-Ramādī.  Ramadi, Iraq
 الرّملة ar-Ramlaḧ.  Ramla, Israel
 رندة Rundaḧ.  Ronda, Spain.
 الرّياض ar-Riyāḍ.  Riyadh, Saudi Arabia
 رأس تنورة Raʼs Tanūraḧ.  Ras Tanura, Saudi Arabia
 رأس الخيمة Raʼs al-Ḫaymaḧ.  Ras al-Khaimah, United Arab Emirates

ز Zāy 
 زنجبار Zinǧibār.  Zanzibar, Tanzania
 الزّقازيق az-Zaqāzīq.  Zagazig, Egypt
 زوارة Zuwāraḧ.  Zuwara, Libya
 الزّويرات az-Zuwayrāt.  Zouérat, Mauritania

س Sīn 
 سامرّاء Sāmarrāʼ.  Samarra, Iraq
 سبتة Sabtaḧ.  Ceuta, Spain.
 سخنين Saḫnīn.  Sakhnin, Israel
 سرقسطة Saraqusṭaḧ.  Zaragoza, Spain
 السّعوديّة as-Saʻūdiyyaḧ.  Saudi Arabia
 سقطرة Suquṭraḧ.  Socotra, Yemen
 السّليمانيّة as-Sulaymāniyyaḧ.  Sulaymaniyah, Iraq
 السّماوة as-Samāwaḧ.  Samawah, Iraq
 سمّورة Sammūraḧ.  Zamora, Spain
 السّودان as-Sūdān.  Sudan
 السّوريا as-Sūriyā.  Syria
 سوسة Sūsaḧ.  Sousse, Tunisia
 السّويس as-Suways.  Suez, Egypt

ش Šīn 
 الشّارجة aš-Šārǧaḧ.  Sharjah, United Arab Emirates
 شنت فيلب Shanta Fīlibb.  Agira, Italy
 شانت مانكش Šānt Mānkaš.  Simancas, Spain
 شقبان Šaqabān.  Sacavém, Portugal
 شريش Šarīš.  Jerez de la Frontera, Spain
 شرم الشّيخ Šarm aš-Šayḫ.  Sharm el-Sheikh, Egypt
 شفا عمر Šafā ʻAmr.  Shefa-Amr, Israel
 شقوبيّة Šiqūbiyyaḧ.  Segovia, Spain
 شلب Šilb.  Silves, Portugal
 شلمنقة Šalamanqaḧ.  Salamanca, Spain
 شناص Šināṣ.  Shinas, Oman
 شنقيط Šinqīṭ.  Chinguetti, Mauritania

ص Ṣād 
 صا فيتا Ṣā Fītā.  Safita, Syria
 صحار Ṣuḥār.  Sohar, Oman
 الصّحراء الغربيّة aṣ-Ṣaḥarāʼ al-ʻArabiyyaḧ.  Western Sahara
 صخرة بلاي Ṣaḫraḧ Bilāy.  Covadonga, Spain
 صفد Ṣafad.  Safed, Israel
 صلالة Ṣalālaḧ.  Salalah, Oman
 صنعاء Ṣanʻāʼ.  Sanaá, Yemen
 صور Ṣūr.  Tyre, Lebanon
 الصّومال aṣ-Ṣūmāl.  Somalia.
 صيدا Ṣaydā.  Sidon, Lebanon
 عين قانا Ain Kana.  Ain Kana, Lebanon

ض Ḍād

ط Ṭāʼ 
 الطائف aṭ-Ṭāʾif. Ta'if, Saudi Arabia
 طبريّة Ṭabariyyaḧ.  Tiberias, Israel
 طرابلس Ṭarābulus.  Tripoli, Lebanon; Tripoli, Libya
 طرّاكونة Ṭarrākūnaḧ.  Tarragona, Spain
 طرسونة Ṭarasūnaḧ.  Tarazona, Spain
 طرطوشة Ṭurṭūšaḧ.  Tortosa, Spain
 طرف الغار Taraf al-Ghar.  Cape Trafalgar, Spain
 طريفة Ṭarīfaḧ.  Tarifa, Spain
 طلبيرة Ṭalabayraḧ.  Talavera de la Reina, Spain
 طليطلة Ṭulayṭulaḧ.  Toledo, Spain
 طنجة Ṭanǧaḧ.  Tangier
 طولكرم Ṭūlkarm.  Tulkarm, West Bank (Palestine)
 طيّبة Ṭayyibaḧ.  Tayibe, Israel
 طيرة Ṭīraḧ.  Tira, Israel

ظ Ẓāʼ 
 ظفار Ẓufār.  Dhofar, Oman
 الظّهران aẓ-Ẓahrān.  Dhahran, Saudi Arabia

ع ʻAyn 
 عبادان ʻAbadan.  Abadan, Iran
 عجمان ʻAǧmān.  Ajman, United Arab Emirates
 عدن ʻAdan.  Aden, Yemen
 العراق al-ʻIrāq.  Iraq
 عرعر ʻArʻar.  Arar, Saudi Arabia
 العريش al-ʻArīš.  Al 'Arish, Egypt
 عسقلان ʻAsqalān.  Ashkelon, Israel
 العقبة al-ʻAqabaḧ.  Aqaba, Jordan
 عكّا ʻAkkā.  Akko, Israel
 عكبرا ʻUkbarā.  Ukbara, Iraq
 عمّان ʻAmmān.  Amman, Jordan
 عُمان ʻUmān.  Oman
 عنّابة ʻAnnābaḧ.  Annaba, Algeria
 عنيزة ʻUnayzaḧ.  Unaizah, Saudi Arabia

غ Ġayn 

 al-Ġahf/al-Kahf. Alquife, Spain
 الغرب al-Ġarb. Algarve, Portugal
 الغردقة al-Ġardaqaḧ.  Hurghada, Egypt
 غرناطة Ġarnāṭaḧ.  Granada, Spain
 غزّة Ġazzaḧ.  Gaza, Gaza Strip

ف Fāʼ 
 فاس Fās.  Fes, Morocco
 الفجيرة Fuǧayraḧ.  Fujairah, United Arab Emirates
 فلسطين Filasṭīn.  Palestine
 الفلّوجة al-Fallūǧaḧ.  Fallujah, Iraq
 فطاني  Fattāni. Pattani, Thailand

ق Qāf 
 قابس Qābis.  Gabès, Tunisia
 قادس Qādis.  Cádiz, Spain
قصُور Qāsur  Kasur, Pakistan
 القدس ʼAl-Quds.  Jerusalem 
 القامشلي al-Qāmišlī.  Qamishli, Syria
 القاموق al-Qāmūq.  Alcamo, Italy
 القاهرة al-Qāhiraḧ.  Cairo, Egypt
 القدس al-Quds.  Jerusalem
 قلعة أيوب Qal‘at ’Ayyūb. Calatayud, Spain
 قرطاج Qarṭāǧ.  Carthage, Tunisia
 قرطاجنة الحلفاء Qarṭāǧannaḧ al-Ḥalfāʼ.  Cartagena, Spain
 قرطبه Qurṭubaḧ.  Córdoba, Spain
 قرمونة Qarmūnaḧ.  Carmona, Spain
 قسنطينة Qusanṭīnaḧ.  Constantine, Algeria
 القصر al-Qaṣr. Alcàsser, Spain
 القصر الكبير al-Qaṣr al-Kabīr.  Ksar el-Kebir, Morocco
 قصر أبي دانس Qaṣr ʼAbī Dānis. Alcácer do Sal, Portugal
 قصر يانه Qaṣr Yānih.  Enna, Italy
 قطانية Qaṭāniyyah.  Catania, Italy
 قطر Qaṭar.  Qatar
 قطيف Qatīf.  Qatif, Saudi Arabia
 قلعة أيوب Qalʻaḧ ʼAyyūb.  Calatayud, Spain
 قلقيلية Qalqīlyaḧ.  Qalqilyah, West Bank (Palestine)
 قلنسوة Qalansawaḧ.  Qalansawe, Israel
 قلهرة Qalahurraḧ.  Calahorra, Spain
 قلعة النساء Qal‘at al-Nisā’.  Caltanissetta, Italy
 القمر al-Qamar.  Comoros
 قنا Qinā.  Qina, Egypt
 القنيطرة al-Qunayṭiraḧ.  Quneitra, Syria
 قونكة Qūnkaḧ.  Cuenca, Spain
 القيرون al-Qayrawn.  Kairouan, Tunisia

ك Kāf 
 كربلاء Karbalāʼ.  Karbala, Iraq
 كركوك Kirkūk.  Kirkuk, Iraq
 كوت Kūt.  Kut, Iraq
 الكوفة al-Kūfaḧ.  Kufa, Iraq
 كوم أمبو Kawm ʼUmbū.  Kom Ombo, Egypt
 الكويت al-Kuwayt.  Kuwait
 كيهيدي Kayhaydī.  Kaédi, Mauritania
 كفيرت Kufairet.  Kferet, Israel

ل Lām 
 اللّاذقيّة al-Lāḏiqiyyaḧ.  Latakia, Syria
 لاردة Lāridaḧ.  Lleida, Spain
 لّبنان Lubnān.  Lebanon
 اللّدّ al-Ludd.  Lod, Israel
 القنت al-Laqant.  Alicante, Spain
 لورقة Lawraqaḧ.  Lorca, Spain
 ليبيّا Lībiyyā.  Libya
 ليّون Liyyūn.  León, Spain

م Mīm 
 ماردة Māridaḧ.  Mérida, Spain
 مالقة Mālaqaḧ.  Málaga, Spain
 المحمرة al-Muhammara.  al Muhammara, Iran
 المدوّر‎ al-Mudawwar.  Almodóvar del Campo, Spain
 المدور al-Mudawwar.  Almodóvar del Pinar, Spain
 المدور العدنة al-Mudawwar al-Adna.  Almodóvar del Río, Spain
 المدوّر al-Mudawwar.  Almodôvar, Portugal
 مدينة شدونة Madīnaẗ Šadūnaḧ.  Medina-Sidonia, Spain
 المدينة المنوّرة al-Madīnaḧ al-Munawwaraḧ.  Medina, Saudi Arabia
 مرتيل Martīl.  Martil, Morocco
 مرسى عليّ Marsā ʻAliyy.  Marsala, Sicily
 مرسى مطروح Marsā Maṭrūḥ.  Marsa Matruh, Egypt
 مرسيّة Mursiyyaḧ.  Murcia, Spain
 المريّة al-Mariyyaḧ.  Almería, Spain
 مسقط Masqaṭ.  Muscat, Oman
 مصر Miṣr.  Egypt
 المغرب al-Maġrib.  Morocco; Maghreb
 مكّة المكرّمة Makkaḧ al-Mukarramaḧ.  Mecca, Saudi Arabia
 ملطة Malṭaḧ.  Malta.
 مليلة Malīlaḧ.  Melilla, Spain
 المنامة al-Manāmaḧ.  Manama, Bahrain
 المنصورة al-Manṣūraḧ.  Al Mansurah, Egypt
 مورور Mawrūr.  Morón, Spain
 مجريط Majrīt. Madrid, Spain 
 موروني Mūrūnī.  Moroni, Comoros
 موزمبيق Mussa Bin Bique. Mozambique
 الموريتانيّا al-Mūrītāniyyā.  Mauritania
 موصل Mawṣil.  Mosul, Iraq

ن Nūn 
 نابلس Nābulus.  Nablus, West Bank (Palestine)
 ناجرة Nāǧiraḧ.  Nájera, Spain
 النّاصرة an-Nāṣiraḧ.  Nazareth, Israel
 ناصريّة Nāṣiriyyaḧ.  Nasiriyah, Iraq
 نجامينا Naǧāmīnā.  N'Djamena, Chad
 نجد Naǧd.  Najd, Saudi Arabia
 نجران Najrān. Najran, Saudi Arabia
 النّجف an-Naǧaf.  Najaf, Iraq
 نزوى Nizwā.  Nizwa, Oman

و Wāw 
 وادان Wādān.  Ouadane, Mauritania
 وادي الحجارة Wādī al-Ḥejāraḧ.  Guadalajara, Spain
 وادي الكبير Wādī al-Kabīr.  Guadalquivir, Spain
 وادي آش Wādī 'Ash.  Guadix, Spain
 الوجاجة al-Wajājaḧ.  Al Wajajah, Oman
 وشقة Wašqaḧ.  Huesca, Spain
 ولاته Walātaḧ.  Oualata, Mauritania
 ولبة Walbaḧ.  Huelva, Spain
 وهران Wahrān.  Oran, Algeria

ي Yāʼ 
 يافا Yāfā.  Jaffa, Palestine
 يبنة Yibnaḧ.  Yavne, Palestine
 اليسّانة al-Yussānaḧ.  Lucena, Spain
 الياج Al-Yāj.  Acireale, Italy
 اليمن al-Yaman.  Yemen
 ينبع البحر Yanbuʻ al-Baḥr.  Yanbu' al Bahr, Saudi Arabia

See also 
 Arabic language
 Arabic name
 Maghreb toponymy
 Toponym

References

External links 
 GEONAMES

Arabic traditional place names